The women's discus throw event at the 2016 IAAF World U20 Championships was held at Zdzisław Krzyszkowiak Stadium on 19 and 21 July.

Medalists

Records

Results

Qualification
Qualification: 51.50 (Q) or at least 12 best performers (q) qualified for the final.

Final

References

Discus throw
Discus throw at the World Athletics U20 Championships